Ranibari is a village located at Thakre Gaupalika ward number 6 of Dhading District. It is 36 kilometers west from Kathmandu, the capital city of Nepal and is 8.5 kilometers from Naubise, a junction from where Prithivi Highway branches out  from Tribhuvan Rajpath. Mahesh Khola along the Prithvi Highway and Agara Khola marks the northern and western border while Mati Khola separates it from south and a pass from the east. It is located at Latitude 27°44'19″ North and longitude 85°06'18″ East. The village can be reached in about two hours of driving from Kalanki, Kathmandu. There are approximately 300 households and  two public schools Shree Setidevi Secondary School (SSSS) and Shree Janajagriti Higher Secondary School. Temple of Setidevi is situated at the top of the village from which the school derives its name.

It has a popular hiking trail starting from Mahadevbesi and exiting at Damechaur, Makwanpur with two hours of walking. Mountains ranging from Annapurna to Gaurishankar seems quite close. Tiny threads of  Prithvi Highway seems fascinating along with yellowish green paddy fields. Beginning of Spring season can be clearly distinguished by reddish Lali Gurans blossoming jungle and peach and pear florescence.

References 
Maskey, R.K., History of Ranibari, 2010,  Buddha Publication
Populated places in Dhading District